Alberts may refer to:
 Alberts (name), a given name and surname
 The Alberts, a British musical comedy troupe

See also
 Cork Alberts F.C., an Irish football club
 FK Alberts, a Latvian football club
 JDFS Alberts, a Latvian football club
 Molecular Biology of the Cell (textbook)
 Albert (disambiguation)
 Albertson (disambiguation)